Maria Josepha of Saxony may refer to:
Princess Maria Josepha of Saxony (1731–1767), daughter of Augustus III of Poland
Maria Josepha Amalia of Saxony (1803–1829), daughter of Maximilian, Hereditary Prince of Saxony
Princess Maria Josepha of Saxony (1867–1944), daughter of George, King of Saxony
Princess Maria Josepha of Saxony (1928–2018), daughter of Friedrich Christian, Margrave of Meissen
Maria Josepha of Austria (1699–1757), wife of Augustus III of Poland